Mark Christopher Schinnerer (June 3, 1899 – October 27, 1978) was a state representative from Ohio, as well as a former SuperIntendent for Cleveland Public Schools.

References

Can We Streamline the Teaching of Foreign Languages?
Cleveland's Forest City Celebrates First Birthday
Cleveland Board of Education v. LaFeur
Recovering a Public Vision for Public Television
The American school board journal, Volume 115

Republican Party members of the Ohio House of Representatives
1899 births
1978 deaths
People from Vigo County, Indiana
20th-century American politicians